Mozvash (also Romanized as Mazvash; also known as Mazoosh) is a village in Hastijan Rural District, in the Central District of Delijan County, Markazi Province, Iran. At the 2006 census, its population was 165, in 65 families.

References 

Populated places in Delijan County